Clayton Rand (May 25, 1891 - February 26, 1971) was an American columnist, writer, publisher, and public speaker. He was the publisher of the Dixie Press and the Dixie Guide in Gulfport, Mississippi, and he (co-)authored six books.

Life
Rand was born on May 25, 1891, in Onalaska, Wisconsin. He grew up in Bond, Mississippi, and graduated from Mississippi State University and Harvard Law School.

Rand began his career in journalism in 1918 in Philadelphia, Mississippi, where he invested in The Neshoba Democrat. In 1925, he moved to Gulfport, Mississippi, and he purchased the Dixie Press and founded the Dixie Guide. Rand was the president of the Mississippi Press Association, and he (co-)authored six books. He was also a syndicated columnist, and "a popular conservative public speaker."

Rand married Ella May Smylie, and they had a son, Tom. He died on February 26, 1971, in Gulfport, Mississippi, at age 79, and he was buried in Evergreen Cemetery.

Selected works

References

External links
Works by Clayton Rand on the Internet Archive

1891 births
1971 deaths
People from Gulfport, Mississippi
People from Onalaska, Wisconsin
Mississippi State University alumni
Harvard Law School alumni
Journalists from Mississippi
American columnists
Writers from Mississippi
Writers from Wisconsin
20th-century American newspaper publishers (people)
20th-century American journalists
American male journalists